George Lindsay Colling (27 August 1946 – 13 July 2003) was a New Zealand rugby union player, coach and administrator. A halfback, Colling represented Otago and Auckland at a provincial level, and was a member of the New Zealand national side, the All Blacks, in 1972 and 1973. He played 21 matches for the All Blacks but did not appear in any internationals. He went on to coach Ponsonby alongside Bryan Williams, and was an All Black selector in 1994. He also served on the board of the Auckland Rugby Union. Colling died of a brain tumour in Auckland in 2003.

References

1946 births
2003 deaths
Auckland rugby union players
Deaths from brain cancer in New Zealand
New Zealand international rugby union players
New Zealand referees and umpires
New Zealand rugby union coaches
New Zealand rugby union players
Otago rugby union players
Rugby union players from Cromwell, New Zealand
Rugby union scrum-halves